Kajzerica is a neighborhood located in the Novi Zagreb – zapad city district of Zagreb, the capital of Croatia. It is located west of Bundek Lake (Jezero Bundek) and east of the Western Rotary and Adriatic Bridge. It has a population of 4,387 (2011).

Zagreb Fair and Zagreb Hippodrome are located in Kajzerica. Kajzerica houses the south end of the old pedestrian-only Sava Bridge. Roads provide access to the Dubrovnik Avenue and the Adriatic Bridge and the neighborhood is served by Zagrebački električni tramvaj tram lines 7 and 14 that travel through Novi Zagreb.

References

Neighbourhoods of Zagreb
Novi Zagreb